This is a list of all personnel changes for the 2011 NBA off-season and 2011–12 NBA season.

Retirement

Front office movements

Head coach changes
Off-season

In-season

General manager changes
Off-season

In-season

Player movement
The following is a list of player movement via free agency and trades.

Trades

Free agency

Free agency started on December 9. All players are unrestricted free agents unless indicated otherwise. A restricted free agent's team has the right to keep the player by matching an offer sheet the player signs with another team.

Note
 * Played overseas during the lockout.

10-day contracts
A player can sign a 10-day contract beginning on February 6. A player can only sign two 10-day contracts with the same team in one season. If the team want to retain the player after the second 10-day contract expired, the team has to sign the player for the remainder of the season.

Released

Waived

Note
 * Released under the amnesty clause in the new CBA, which gives teams a one-time option to waive a player's remaining contract from the salary cap.

Training camp cuts
The following players were signed and invited to the training camp but were waived before the start of the season.

D-League assignments
Each NBA team can assign players with two years or less of experience to its affiliated NBA Development League team. Players with more than two years of experience may be assigned to the D-League with the players' consent.

Note
Numbers in parentheses indicates the number of assignments a player has received during the season.

Going overseas
The following players were on NBA rosters at the end of the previous season. Many players signed with teams from other leagues due to the 2011 NBA lockout. FIBA allowed players under NBA contracts to sign and play for teams from other leagues if the contracts had opt-out clauses that allowed the players to return to the NBA if the lockout ended. The Chinese Basketball Association, however, only allowed its clubs to sign foreign free agents who could play for at least the entire season. Chinese nationals were exempt from this rule; this allowed Yi Jianlian to return to the NBA upon the end of the lockout. The list also includes unsigned 2011 draft picks who signed with teams from other leagues, but excludes unsigned 2011 draft picks who were already playing overseas before the draft.

Before and during the lockout

Note

After the lockout

Draft

2011 NBA Draft

The 2011 NBA draft was held on June 23, 2011 at Prudential Center in Newark, New Jersey. In two rounds 60 players were selected in the draft. 27 of the 30 first-round picks signed rookie contracts and were named in the 2010–11 season opening day roster. 21 of the 30 second-round picks also signed rookie contracts, but one of them was waived before the start of the season and became a free agent. 12 other draft picks were unsigned but their draft rights are still held by the NBA teams.

First round

Second round

Previous years draftees

Notes

References

Transactions: 2011–2012 Season. NBA.com. Turner Sports Interactive, Inc
2011 NBA Free Agent Tracker. Sports Illustrated. Time Warner Company
NBA Development League: 2011–12 Assignments. NBA.com. Turner Sports Interactive, Inc

External links
Transactions: 2011–2012 Season at NBA.com
2011 Free Agent Tracker at NBA.com
NBA Trades and Transactions at ESPN.com

Transactions
NBA transactions